Smârdan, as well Smîrdan or Smurdan, may refer to several places:

 Romania
 Smârdan, Galați, a commune in Galați County
 Smârdan, Tulcea, a commune in Tulcea County
 Smârdan, a village in Brădeanu Commune, Buzău County
 Smârdan, a village in Suharău Commune, Botoșani County
 Smârdan, a village in Ciupercenii Noi Commune, Dolj County
 Smârdan, a village in Beciu Commune, Teleorman County

 Bulgaria
 Inovo (formerly Smârdan), a village in Vidin Municipality, Vidin Province
 Vidin-Smurdan, alternative name of Vidin airport, adjacent to Inovo village